Orpheus vs. the Sirens is a studio album by Brownsville rapper Kaseem "Ka" Ryan and Los Angeles producer  "Animoss" together known as Hermit and the Recluse. It was released on August 18, 2018 via Obol for Charon Records. Recording sessions took place at Seaside Lounge in Brooklyn. Production was handled entirely by Animoss. It features a single guest appearance from Citizen Cope.

The album was promoted by three music videos: "Sirens", directed by Alina Popescu, "Argo" and "Oedipus", both directed by Animoss and Ka.

Critical reception

Orpheus vs. the Sirens was met with generally favorable reviews from critics. At Album of the Year, which assigns a normalized rating out of 100 to reviews from mainstream publications, the album received an average score of 83 based on four reviews.

Evan Coral of Tiny Mix Tapes said, "The self-mythologizing that Ka composes on Orpheus vs. the Sirens constitutes a minoritarian epic that resounds with the properly poetic catharsis that might purge the constraints from a life’s definition". Torii MacAdams of Pitchfork said, "In a twist, the Brownsville rapper projects the streetwise narratives of his youth through the lens of Greek mythology—an audacious move, but his hypnotic voice and evocative writing pull it off". M.T. Richards of Exclaim! said, "Ka's music will be a tough sell for hip-hop fans accustomed to baroque maximalism. Orpheus vs. the Sirens is almost confrontationally intimate; long stretches pass without any percussion at all".

Accolades

Track listing

Personnel
 Kaseem "Ka" Ryan – vocals
 "Animoss" – producer
 Clarence Greenwood – featured artist (track 8)
 Chris Pummill – recording
 Charles Scott Harding – mixing
 CandIdo Casillas – additional ProTools editing
 Michael Fossenkemper – mastering
 JJ Golden – lacquer cut
 Mark Shaw – design

References

External links
 

2018 albums
Ka (rapper) albums